The 15th Pan American Games were held in Rio de Janeiro, Brazil from 13 July 2007 to 29 July 2007. Sprinter Sherry Fletcher won the nation's first ever medal at the Pan American Games, claiming bronze in the women's 200 metres.

Medals

Bronze

Women's 200 metres: Sherry Fletcher

Results by event

Triathlon

Men's Competition
Marc DeCaul
 did not finish — no ranking

See also
Grenada at the 2006 Commonwealth Games
Grenada at the 2008 Summer Olympics

External links
Rio 2007 Official website

Nations at the 2007 Pan American Games
P
2007